France Bleu Béarn Bigorre is a regional public radio station part of the French France Bleu network, which is owned by the public state radio service Radio France. It broadcasts and serves the Béarn (Pyrénées-Atlantiques) area. Studios are in Pau.

France Bleu Béarn started broadcasting in the early 1980s under the name Radio France Béarn. On 4 September 2000, 38 local stations of Radio France and Radio Bleue combined to become France Bleu, so Radio France Béarn was renamed to France Bleu Béarn.

In 2017, the station expanded to the Bigorre area with transmitters at Tarbes and Lourdes and renamed itself France Bleu Béarn Bigorre in 2020 to reflect its enlarged service area.

Frequencies

Pyrénées-Atlantiques (64)
 Pau : 102.5 MHz
 Arudy : 105.0
 Laruns : 96.4
 Lembeye : 104.8
 Lescun : 102.9
 Oloron-Sainte-Marie : 93.2
 Orthez : 104.8

External links
France Bleu Béarn Website
Radio France Website

References

Radio stations in France
Radio stations established in 1980
Radio France